George Washington Dixon (October 19, 1933 – August 6, 1990) was a professional Canadian football player and a Canadian Interuniversity Sport football coach.

While Dixon played in only 76 games during his injury-shortened, seven-year career, all with the Alouettes, he is remembered as one of their finest players. Dixon's jersey #28 is one of seven retired by the Alouettes, and he was inducted into the Canadian Football Hall of Fame in 1974. In 2006, Dixon was voted to the Honour Roll of the CFL's Top 50 players of the league's modern era by Canadian sports network TSN. After his playing career ended, Dixon was the head coach of the Loyola College Warriors (now Concordia Stingers) Canadian college football team in the late 1960s-early 1970s.

College and NFL career 
Dixon was born in New Haven, Connecticut in 1934, and was a graduate of the nearby University of Bridgeport, where he starred as a running back for the Purple Knights.

Following graduation, Dixon was drafted by the Green Bay Packers in the 9th round (97th pick) of the 1959 NFL Draft. His impressive 95 yard kickoff return for a touchdown on August 23, 1959, against the San Francisco 49ers in an exhibition game, was not enough to keep rookie head coach Vince Lombardi from cutting him. Dixon missed out on a chance to be part of one of the NFL's great dynasties, becoming a Canadian Football Hall of Fame member instead.

CFL career 
With Verdun Shamcats offensive lineman, and later Alouettes General Manager, Bob Geary blocking for him, Dixon amassed 5,615 yards on 896 carries, for an average of 6.3 yards a carry. He scored 59 touchdowns, 42 by rushing. His best day came on September 5, 1960, when he scored 4 touchdowns against the Ottawa Rough Riders. Dixon rushed for 100 yards in a game 24 times in his career.

Although the Alouettes did not have a winning season during Dixon's time with the club, the Alouettes made the playoffs 5 of the 7 years, losing in the Eastern Division semi-finals in 4 of those years. Dixon will also forever be in the Alouettes, and CFL, record book for his 109-yard longest run from scrimmage, against the Ottawa Rough Riders, on September 2, 1963. He also set the Larks one game rushing record that day, with 235 yards.

The following, 1963 CFL season was also a good one, with Dixon amassing 1,270 yards rushing and equalling his All-Star honours of the previous year.

Dixon's great accomplishments have not gone unremembered. His uniform number, 28, has been retired by the Alouettes, and he was inducted into the Canadian Football Hall of Fame on May 6, 1974. In November 2006, Dixon was voted to the Honour Roll of the CFL's top 50 players of the league's modern era by Canadian sports network TSN.

Career regular season rushing statistics 

See: https://www.statscrew.com/football/stats/p-dixongeo001

Later life and death 
After his playing career ended, Dixon coached the Loyola College Warriors, of Montreal, to great and unexpected success. The following quote is taken from the Concordia University 2006 Sports Hall of Fame induction (Loyola merged with Sir George Williams University to create Concordia in 1974:)

Dixon died on August 6, 1990, in Montreal, at the age of 56.

Videos

References

1933 births
1990 deaths
Canadian football people from Montreal
Sportspeople from New Haven, Connecticut
Players of American football from Connecticut
Players of Canadian football from Quebec
African-American players of American football
American football running backs
Bridgeport Purple Knights football players
Green Bay Packers players
American players of Canadian football
African-American players of Canadian football
Canadian football running backs
Montreal Alouettes players
Canadian Football League Most Outstanding Player Award winners
Canadian Football Hall of Fame inductees
American emigrants to Canada
Anglophone Quebec people
20th-century African-American sportspeople